Aris Nikaias (full name Gymnastikos Athlitikos Omilos Aris Nikaias/ G.N.O. Aris Nikaias ) is a Greek multi-sport club based in Nikaia, Piraeus. The club was founded in 1973, when members of the club were detached from the nearby Ionikos. The club has divisions for many different sports. It has won four straight women's handball championships. Its logo is a star, and its colors are yellow and blue.

Departments
Team sports
Basketball team, the basketball team plays in Greek C Basketball League (2105–16)
Handball team, the handball team plays in A2 Ethniki Handball (2105–16)
Volleyball team
Water polo team
The club has also departments in various individual sports.

History
Aris Nikaias was founded in 1973 by former members of Ionikos Nikaias. The club acquired departments in various sports. The most successful were the basketball, volleyball, and handball. The first achievements came from the women's handball department. Aris Nikaias won 4 consecutive women's championships between 1982 and 1985. The volleyball team achieved to reach in A1 Ethniki in 2000, winning the A2 Ethniki Volleyball championship of the season 1999-2000. Recently the basketball team promoted to Greek C Basketball League. This year, the handball and the basketball team play in national divisions, the basketball team in C League (4th-tier) and handball team in A2 Ethniki (2nd-tier).

Honours
Greek Women's Handball Championship
Winner (4): 1982, 1983, 1984, 1985

References

External links
 Official page

Nikaia-Agios Ioannis Rentis
Multi-sport clubs in Piraeus